Mario Millini or Mario Mellini (1677–1756) was a Roman Catholic cardinal.

Biography
Millini was born on 9 February 1677 in Rome, Italy. He was promoted to the cardinalate at the request of Empress Maria Theresa of Austria.

References

1677 births
1756 deaths
18th-century Italian cardinals